Maumtrasna (alternative spelling Maamtrasna) is the highest peak in the Partry Mountains in south County Mayo, Ireland. The Srahnalong River runs southwest from the peak to the westernmost shore of Lough Mask. The townland of Maumtrasna is on the south bank of the Srahnalong. The townland was the location of the infamous Maumtrasna murders in 1882.

Etymology 
The name derives from its Irish name (Mám Trasna) which is roughly translated as the "Mountain pass crossing".

See also
Lists of mountains in Ireland
Lists of mountains and hills in the British Isles
List of P600 mountains in the British Isles
List of Marilyns in the British Isles
List of Hewitt mountains in England, Wales and Ireland

References 

 Listing at mountainviews.ie

Mountains and hills of County Mayo
Gaeltacht places in County Mayo
Mountains under 1000 metres